This is a list of civil parishes in the ceremonial county of Leicestershire, England. There are 233 civil parishes.

Population figures are unavailable for some of the smallest parishes.

The districts of Leicester and Oadby and Wigston (Oadby and Wigston) are entirely unparished. Coalville, Hinckley, Loughborough, Market Harborough and Melton Mowbray are also unparished.

See also
 List of civil parishes in England

References

External links
 Office for National Statistics : Geographical Area Listings

Civil parishes
Leicestershire
 
Civil parishes